Gonyostomus goniostomus is a species of air-breathing land snails, terrestrial pulmonate gastropod mollusks in the family Strophocheilidae.

This species is endemic to Brazil. Although it has sometimes been thought to be extinct, it has nonetheless been found on the Buzios Island off the northern  coast  of the São Paulo State

References

Strophocheilidae
Fauna of Brazil
Endemic fauna of Brazil
Gastropods described in 1821
Taxonomy articles created by Polbot
Taxobox binomials not recognized by IUCN